Chloanthes parviflora is a species of flowering plant in the family Lamiaceae. It is a small, rounded shrub with dark green, linear leaves and mauve tubular flowers. It grows in New South Wales and Queensland.

Description
Flowering occurs from June to November but mostly in spring and the fruit is usually oblong to obovate, dry,  somewhat compressed,  in diameter and notched at the apex.

Taxonomy and naming
 Chloanthes parviflora was first formally described in 1845 by Wilhelm Gerhard Walpers and the description was published in Repertorium Botanices Systematicae. The specific epithet (parvilflora) means "small flowered".

Distribution and habitat
This species grows in sandy to gravelly soils in heath and sclerophyll forest.  In New South Wales it grows from north of Cooma to Grafton, Coffs Harbour and the  Pilliga Scrub. In the south  of the state between Braidwood and Nerriga. In Queensland it is found mostly in the eastern and south-eastern locations, including Jericho, Blackdown, and Brisbane, near Rockhampton  and Toowoomba.

References

parviflora
Flora of New South Wales
Flora of Queensland
Lamiales of Australia
Plants described in 1845
Taxa named by Wilhelm Gerhard Walpers